Arthur Wellesley Dean (27 August 1857 – 7 February 1929) was a Conservative Party politician in the United Kingdom.

Dean of Carlton Scroop Manor, Grantham,  was elected as the Member of Parliament (MP) for Holland with Boston at a by-election in July 1924 and re-elected at the general election in November 1924. He held the seat until his death in early 1929.  The resulting by-election for his seat was won by the Liberal Party candidate James Blindell, the Liberals' last by-election gain until the 1958 Torrington by-election.

References

External links 
 

1857 births
1929 deaths
Conservative Party (UK) MPs for English constituencies
UK MPs 1924–1929